Kimberly Johnson (born 1971) is an American poet and Renaissance scholar.

Life
Johnson was raised in Utah. She earned her MA in 1995 from the Johns Hopkins University Writing Seminars, her MFA in 1997 Iowa Writers' Workshop, and a PhD in 2003 from University of California, Berkeley.

She teaches courses in creative writing and Renaissance literature at Brigham Young University (BYU). Johnson's academic interests include lyric poetry, John Milton, and John Donne.

Her work has appeared in The New Yorker, Slate, The Iowa Review, 32 Poems, The Yale Review, and The Best American Poetry 2020, and her translations from Latin and Greek have been published in literary and academic journals. She has also published a number of scholarly articles on seventeenth-century literature.

She has edited a collection of essays on Renaissance literature, and an online archive of John Donne's complete sermons.

She was married to poet Jay Hopler until his death in June 2022.

Awards
In 2005, she was awarded a Creative Writing Fellowship from the National Endowment for the Arts to support the completion of her second collection, A Metaphorical God. In 2011, she received a Guggenheim Fellowship.

Books

Poetry
Leviathan with a Hook, Persea Books, 2002, 
A Metaphorical God, Persea Books, 2008, 
Uncommon Prayer, Persea Books, 2014, 
Fatal, Persea Books, 2022,

Criticism
Made Flesh: Sacrament and Poetics in Post-Reformation England, University of Pennsylvania Press, 2014,

Translations
Virgil, Georgics, Penguin Classics, 2009, 
Hesiod, Theogony and Works and Days, Northwestern University Press, 2017.

As editor
Before the Door of God: An Anthology of Devotional Poetry, Yale University Press, 2013, 
Divisions on a Ground: Essays on Renaissance Literature in Honor of Donald M. Friedman, George Herbert Journal Special Series and Monographs, 2008,

References

External links 
 Author's website
 "A Metaphorical God with Poet Kimberly Johnson", Thinking Aloud, Marcus Smith, 9/29/2008
 "Poetry: Kimberly Johnson", Hammer Readings, 5/14/09
 "Kimberly Johnson", Verse Daily
 "A Metaphorical God", Persea Books
 "Leviathan with a Hook", Persea Books
 "The Georgics", Penguin Classics Catalogue
Readings
http://jacket2.org/commentary/remaking-it-new

1971 births
Johns Hopkins University alumni
Brigham Young University faculty
American women poets
University of Iowa alumni
University of California, Berkeley alumni
Living people
Iowa Writers' Workshop alumni
Writers from Salt Lake City
Place of birth missing (living people)
Translators of Virgil